Hansel Orlando Zapata Zape (born 11 February 1995) is a Colombian professional footballer who plays as an attacking midfielder for Iranian club Aluminium Arak.

Career
Zapata started his career with Unión Magdalena. He made his debut in the Categoría Primera B on 15 February 2015. He then transferred to Categoría Primera A club Once Caldas ahead of the 2017 season. He has later played for two other clubs in the Colombian top division, namely Millonarios and La Equidad.

On 29 June 2021, Zapata signed for Moldovan National Division club FC Sheriff Tiraspol.

References

External links

1995 births
Living people
Sportspeople from Cauca Department
Association football midfielders
Colombian footballers
Unión Magdalena footballers
Once Caldas footballers
La Equidad footballers
Millonarios F.C. players
FC Sheriff Tiraspol players
Categoría Primera B players
Categoría Primera A players
Moldovan Super Liga players
Colombian expatriate footballers
Expatriate footballers in Moldova
Colombian expatriate sportspeople in Moldova